Puccinia umbilici is a fungal plant pathogen which causes rust on navelwort (Umbilicus rupestris). It is found in Europe, Japan, Russia and the United States.

References

External links
 Puccinia umbilici on Aphotofungi

umbilici
Fungal plant pathogens and diseases
Fungi described in 1830
Fungi of Europe
Fungi of Japan
Fungi of the United States
Galls
Fungi without expected TNC conservation status